Bliss is a 2019 horror film written and directed by Joe Begos. Described as a vampire film, it concerns an artist named Dezzy (Dora Madison Burge, credited as Dora Madison) who descends into madness after taking a hallucinogenic drug to overcome a creative block.

Cast
 Dora Madison as Dezzy
 Tru Collins as Courtney
 Rhys Wakefield as Ronnie
 Jeremy Gardner as Clive
 Graham Skipper as Hadrian
 Chris McKenna as David
 Rachel Avery as Nikki St. Jean
 Mark Beltzman as Lance
 George Wendt as Pops
 Abraham Benrubi as Abe

Release 
Begos showed Bliss at 2019's Fantastic Fest in Austin, alongside another current film of his, VFW. It was also shown at New Orleans's Overlook Film Festival.

Reception
The site's the consensus states: "Bliss maybe too narratively and visually intense for less adventurous viewers, but should trigger the titular state for those with a taste for hard hitting horror." On Metacritic it has a score of 53% based on reviews from 6 critics, indicating "mixed or average reviews".

The A.V. Club reviewer Katie Rife said that it "represents a stylistic leap forward for its director" and compared it to the work of Lucio Fulci, Gaspar Noé, and Abel Ferrara.

References

External links
 

2019 horror films
2019 films
American vampire films
2010s English-language films
2010s American films